Remsen Village, also formerly known as Rugby, is a neighborhood in central Brooklyn, New York City. It comprises the eastern part of the larger neighborhood of East Flatbush area, and is administered by Brooklyn Community Board 17.

Name
Although it has been described as a "subsection of the larger East Flatbush neighborhood," with an estimated 60,000 residents. it has its own identity as "the Remsen Village neighborhood of Brooklyn" and also as "Rugby-Remsen Village.

Use of the name Remsen Village by residents and local organizations began before the 1970s, but more widespread use appears to have originated in the mid-1990s, with identification continuing a decade later and into 2019.

The name "Rugby" (also the name of a road within the area) was described in 2016 by the New York Times as "the old name for the area."

Location
Related to the above namings are references such as 
 "Remsen Village, located between East Flatbush and Brownsville."
 "Remsen Village (East Flatbush)/Canarsie"
 "the Remsen Village section of East Flatbush"

Population
Remsen Village's population is over one third of Brooklyn Community Board 17's, the administrative unit to which it belongs, along with "East Flatbush, ...  Farragut, Rugby, Erasmus and Ditmas Village."

Geographic recognition
The name is used as a geographic unit in Brooklyn
encompassing a 2+ mile distance.

Government recognition
 The New York City Department of City Planning lists Remsen Village as being part of District 17,
 NYS Assemblymember Diana C. Richardson (Assembly District 43) identified her district as including East Flatbush, Northeast Flatbush, Rugby, Farragut/Hyde Park, Remsen Village, Ditmas Village

History

Two Remsen lanes 
Brooklyn has a Remsen Street in one neighborhood (Brooklyn Heights), and a Remsen Avenue in another (Canarsie); both are named after a Dutch family "that was among the early settlers of" the borough. An article about the aforementioned cites a book named "The Neighborhoods of Brooklyn" which refers to Remsen Village.

Lower-case neighborhood
One real-estate source referred to Flatbush having "eleven neighborhoods" "many no larger than a few square blocks;" Remsen Village is much larger.

See also
 East Flatbush, Brooklyn

References

Neighborhoods in Brooklyn  
East Flatbush, Brooklyn